This is the discography for Mission of Burma, a post-punk band from Boston.

Albums

Studio albums
Vs. (Ace of Hearts, 1982)
ONoffON (Matador, 2004)
The Obliterati (Matador, 2006)
The Sound the Speed the Light (Matador, 2009)
Unsound (Fire, 2012)

EPs
Signals, Calls, and Marches (Ace of Hearts, 1981)
Peking Spring (Taang!, 1988)
Four Hands EP (Matador, 2004)

Compilation albums
Forget (Taang!, 1988)
Mission of Burma (Rykodisc, 1988)
Peking Spring (Taang!, 1989)
Let There Be Burma (Emergo/Taang!, 1990)
Accomplished: The Best of Mission of Burma (Rykodisc, 2004)
A Gun to the Head: A Selection from the Ace of Hearts Era (Rykodisc, 2004)
12 Classic 45s V/A Compilation, Songs: "Academy Fight Song", "Max Ernst", "Trem Two", "OK/No Way" (Ace of Hearts, 2006)
Learn How: The Essential Mission of Burma (Fire Records, 2012)

Live albums
The Horrible Truth About Burma (Ace of Hearts, 1985)
Snapshot (Matador, 2004)

Singles
"Academy Fight Song" b/w "Max Ernst" (Ace of Hearts, 1980)
"Trem Two" b/w "OK/No Way" (Ace of Hearts, 1982)
"Active in the Yard" b/w "Active in the Yard" by Spore (Taang! Records, 1994)
"Dirt" b/w "Falling" (2004)
"Innermost" b/w "...And Here It Comes" (Matador, 2009)
"Dust Devil" (Fire, 2012)
"Panic Is No Option" (Self-released, 2016)

Video albums
Live at the Bradford VHS (Atavistic/Ace of Hearts, 1989)
Live at Tsongas Arena DVD [released in limited versions of The Obliterati (Matador, 2005)]
Not a Photograph DVD (2006)
Live at the Space 1979/Live at the Underground 1980 [released with Signals, Calls and Marches, the Definitive Collection I (Matador, 2008)]
 Live at The Bradford Ballroom, March 12, 1983 Afternoon Show [released with Vs., the Definitive Collection II (Matador, 2008)]
 Live at The Bradford Ballroom, March 12, 1983 Late Show [released with The Horrible Truth about Burma, the Definitive Collection III (Matador, 2008)]

References

Discography
Rock music group discographies
Discographies of American artists